Opawa is a suburb of Christchurch, New Zealand.

Opawa may also refer to:

Poland
 Opawa, Lower Silesian Voivodeship, a village in SW Poland

 New Zealand
 Ōpaoa River, a river through Blenheim
 Opawa River Bridge, a bridge in Blenheim
 Little Opawa River, a river in south Canterbury

See also 
 Opava, a city in the northern Czech Republic on the river Opava
 Opava (disambiguation)